Wang Dan (born January 16, 1984 in Henan) is a female Chinese swimmer, who competed for Team China at the 2008 Summer Olympics.

Major achievements

2001 National Games - 4th 100m free;
2003 National Championships - 1st 100m/200m free;
2005 World Championships - 1st 4 × 100 m/4 × 200 m free relay;
2006 Asian Games - 1st 4 × 100 m free relay

References
http://2008teamchina.olympic.cn/index.php/personview/personsen/783

1984 births
Living people
Chinese female freestyle swimmers
Swimmers from Henan
Olympic swimmers of China
Asian Games medalists in swimming
Swimmers at the 2006 Asian Games
Asian Games gold medalists for China
Medalists at the 2006 Asian Games
Swimmers at the 2008 Summer Olympics